Mirnel Sadović (born 25 May 1984 in Sarajevo, SR Bosnia, SFR Yugoslavia) is a Bosnian retired footballer.

Club career
Sadović played the large part of his career in the Austrian leagues.

References

External links 
 

1985 births
Living people
Footballers from Sarajevo
Association football forwards
Bosnia and Herzegovina footballers
Bosnia and Herzegovina under-21 international footballers
FK Austria Wien players
Arminia Bielefeld players
FK Sarajevo players
SC Untersiebenbrunn players
SC Austria Lustenau players
Kremser SC players
FC Admira Wacker Mödling players
SKN St. Pölten players
SC Wiener Neustadt players
SC Rheindorf Altach players
Floridsdorfer AC players
Austrian Football Bundesliga players
2. Bundesliga players
Premier League of Bosnia and Herzegovina players
2. Liga (Austria) players
Austrian Landesliga players
Austrian Regionalliga players
Bosnia and Herzegovina expatriate footballers
Expatriate footballers in Austria
Bosnia and Herzegovina expatriate sportspeople in Austria
Expatriate footballers in Germany
Bosnia and Herzegovina expatriate sportspeople in Germany